Alice Azure (born July 30, 1940) is an American poet and writer. She is a member of the Wordcraft Circle of Native Writers and Storytellers and the St. Louis Poetry Center.

Biography
Azure was born in North Adams, Massachusetts. Her father, Joseph Alfred Hatfield, was born in Yarmouth, Nova Scotia, but grew up in northern Maine and New Hampshire. Azure's mother, Catherine Pedersen, was born in West Springfield, Massachusetts, but spent her formative years in Mandal, Norway from about 1924 to 1934.  At the age of eleven, family strife sent Azure and her siblings to live in the Cromwell Children's Home in Connecticut. Azure lived there from 1951 to 1959.

Azure has been married twice. She married Tom Liljegren in 1960, and they had three children, Kathryn, Michael, and Patti. After twenty years of marriage, they divorced. Her second husband, Alec Azure, died after only two and a half years of marriage. Through her grief, Azure devoted more of her time to writing. Before she began writing, Azure worked for the United Way, starting as a volunteer in 1975, then as a professional in 1979. Except for a four-year period from mid-1990 to 1994, she remained a community planner in various local United Ways until her retirement January 2006.

She currently lives in Maryville, Illinois.

Ancestry
In her memoir, Along Came A Spider, Azure writes that she "searched and struggled" for 35 years to do genealogical research on her family, including taking a visit to Nova Scotia. Azure is a member of Association des Acadiens Metis-Sourquois ("salt water people"), a controversial, "Eastern Metis" social group located in Saulnierville, Digby County, Nova Scotia.

Featured writing
Azure's work has been featured in many journals and magazines, including
"Facing Down the Black Robes: An Interview with Charlene Eastman."  Yellow Medicine Review, Ed. Chip Livingston. Fall 2012.
"August Offerings" in The Florida Review, Volume 35, Number 1. Summer 2010
"From Wasouk to Shoah and Back: A Mi’kmaq Honor Song" in Eating Fire, Tasting Blood: An Anthology of the American Indian Holocaust
"Green Bay Blues" in Shenandoah: The Washington and Lee University Review
"Horicon II" in The Cream City Review
"The Clown's Dance" in Native Chicago
"Someday I Will Dance," "Glooscap's Messenger," "Katahdin Pilgrimage," and "Speelya Visions" in Micmac Maliseet Nations News
"Bitterness Bundle" in Word Trails: Wordcraft Circle Quarterly Journal
"Coyote Medicine Man," "Abnaki Winter,"  "Speelya Visions," "Glooscap's Messenger," "Someday I Will Dance," "Katahdin Pilgrimage," "To Michael," "Cumulative Pasts," "To Joanie, My Sister," "Animus Fantasy," "Leaving Maine," and "Elegy For My Cowboy" in Skins: Drumbeats from City 
"Isolation" in Pegasus 1960: The North Park Literature and Arts Review

Publications
Along Came A Spider. Mayville, IL: Bowman Books, 2011. 
In Mi'kmaq Country: selected poems & stories. Chicago, IL: Albatross Press, 2007.
Games of Transformation. Chicago, IL: Albatross Press, 2011. .  Winner of the 2012 Poetry award from the Wordcraft Circle of Native Writers and Storytellers.
Hunger Feast. Chicago, IL: Albatross Press, 2017.

References

External links
Alice Azure Official Website
Senier, Siobhan, "Rethinking Recognition: Mi’kmaq and Maliseet Poets Re-Write Land and Community" in MELUS
Wordcraft Circle of Native Writers and Storytellers webpage
St. Louis Poetry Center webpage
In Mi'kmaq Country book review

1940 births
Living people
American women poets
American people of Norwegian descent
21st-century American memoirists
American women memoirists
University of Iowa alumni
People from Maryville, Illinois
21st-century American women writers
21st-century American poets